Finsch is a relatively small lunar impact crater in the mid-part of Mare Serenitatis that has been almost completely (other than the crest of the rim) covered by the mare, forming a ghost crater in the lava plain. It was named after German zoologist Otto Finsch.

References

Other sources 

 
 
 
 
 
 
 
 
 
 
 

Impact craters on the Moon